Jacob is an important figure in Abrahamic religions.

Jacob may also refer to:

People
 Jacob (name), a male given name and surname, including a list of variants of the name
 Jacob (surname), including a list of people with the surname
 Jacob (Book of Mormon prophet)
 James (name), a version of Jacob

Places
 Jacob, Illinois, U.S.
 Jacob River (Quebec), in Canada

Other uses
 Jacob (clothing retailer), a Canadian store chain
 Jacob (film), a 1994 German/Italian/American TV film
 Jacob (unit), or jow, an obsolete unit of length in India
 Jacob, a 2022 album by Ty Herndon
 Jacob sheep, a British breed of domestic sheep
 Book of Jacob, in the Book of Mormon
 Jacob's, a brand name for several lines of biscuits and crackers
 Jacob & Co, an American jewelry and wristwatch retailer
 Jacob Wall, the founder and lead developer of the game Cookie Clicker

See also
 
 St. Jacob (disambiguation)
 Saint James (disambiguation)
 Jakob (disambiguation)
 Jacobs (disambiguation)
 Jacob's Ladder (disambiguation)
 Jacobean (disambiguation)
 Jacobia (disambiguation)
 Jacobian (disambiguation)
 Jacobin (disambiguation)
 Jacobite (disambiguation)
 Jacobsen (disambiguation)
 Jacobson (disambiguation)
 Jacobus (disambiguation)